Oleksandr Medvedko is a former Prosecutor General of Ukraine Medvedko was installed in a political deal with the Party of Regions.

Biography
In December 2009, during the 2010 Ukrainian presidential election campaign, incumbent Prime Minister of Ukraine and presidential candidate Yulia Tymoshenko promised to replace Medvedko if elected president. Tymoshenko said Medvedko is controlled by the opposition Party of Regions headed by (also presidential candidate) Victor Yanukovych. According to her that has made it impossible to hold accountable individuals responsible for bank fraud on a massive scale during the fall of 2008.

Although Medvedko's term was set to expire in November 2012 Ukrainian President Victor Yanukovych dismissed Medvedko as prosecutor general on 3 November 2010. According to Yanukovych Medvedko had asked for his resignation because he believed "that there should be rotation of senior staff".

References

External links
Biography at the Ukrainian High Council of Justice website

General Prosecutors of Ukraine
1955 births
Living people
People from Zaporizhzhia Oblast
Yaroslav Mudryi National Law University alumni